Forbidden Island is a cooperative board game developed by Matt Leacock and published by Gamewright Games in 2010. Two to four players take the roles of different adventurers, moving around a mysterious island, looking for hidden treasures as the island sinks around them. All players win if they find all the hidden treasures and they all make it back to the helicopter and fly away, and they all lose if they cannot.

Gameplay 

Players take on the role of adventurers, with randomly selected abilities, trying to retrieve treasures from a rapidly sinking island. They must retrieve four treasures: (The Earth Stone, the Crystal of Fire, the Statue of the Wind, and the Ocean Chalice) and return to the helicopter landing pad ("Fools Landing") before the waters rise covering the entire island. The board consists of a random distribution of 4x4 tiles, with an additional two tiles beyond each side of the square. 

A deck of cards (the "flood deck") corresponding to the locations of the board drives the game: at the beginning of the game, the locations of the top six cards of that deck are flipped and considered "flooded". After every player's turn, new cards from that deck are drawn and the corresponding tiles are flooded or, if they are already flooded, "sink" by disappearing from the board, thus shrinking the island. Additional cards of this deck ("Waters Rise") increase the "flood meter" on the board

On their turn, a player may take up to three actions among moving to an adjacent tile, shoring up an adjacent flooded tile, giving a treasure to another player, collecting a treasure, or the role-specific action of that player. The player then draws two cards from the "treasure deck"; these cards allow the eventual collecting of the corresponding treasure.

The players win if they manage to find all the treasures and escape from the island. They lose if the flood meter reaches its maximum value, if the helicopter pad disappears, if a treasure becomes unattainable, if a player is on a sinking tile and cannot get to a non-sunken tile, or if the entire island disappears.

Sequel games 

A sequel to Forbidden Island was released in 2013, titled Forbidden Desert. The game is situated in a desert and still employs many of the same mechanics as Forbidden Island. However, there is added difficulty as well as new player roles and mechanics.

A second sequel, Forbidden Sky was published in 2018, in which players try to repair a rocket in order to escape a floating platform during a thunderstorm. It features more substantial changes to the gameplay, as players now build the map of the platform as they explore, and use magnetic metal and plastic pieces to build an actual circuit to activate lights and sound in a model rocket.

A third sequel, Forbidden Jungle, will be published in 2023.

Reception
In a review of Forbidden Island in Black Gate, Andrew Zimmerman Jones said "Overall, there's really nothing negative I can say about this game. It is an outstanding cooperative game that's fun for all ages, and for experience levels ranging from hard-core gamers to casual gamers to novices. Once you play a couple of times, the set-up is extremely quick and the game itself goes quickly as well."

Awards 

 Winner for Golden Geek Best Children's Board Game 2010
 Winner for Mensa Select 2010
 Winner for UK Game Expo Best Family/Children's Game 2011
 Nominee for Spiel des Jahres 2011

References

External links
Forbidden Island product page at Gamewright Games
Forbidden Island page at BoardGameGeek
Forbidden Island YouTube video on the TableTop web series.
Forbidden Island Rulebook

Board games introduced in 2010
Cooperative board games
Gamewright Games games
Islands in fiction
Mensa Select winners